, nicknamed "Brave Man", is a professional Japanese baseball player. He plays infielder for the Chiba Lotte Marines.

Career
He was selected .

On February 27, 2019, he was selected for Japan national baseball team at the 2019 exhibition games against Mexico.

References

External links

 NPB.com

1992 births
Living people
Chiba Lotte Marines players
Japanese baseball players
Nippon Professional Baseball infielders
Baseball people from Hyōgo Prefecture
Waseda University alumni